Castelnau may refer to:

Places

France
Castelnau or Castelnaud (castel 'castle' and nau 'new' in Occitan) is part of the name of several communes in the south of France:

 Castelnau-Barbarens, in the Gers département 
 Castelnau-Chalosse, in the Landes département
 Castelnau-d'Anglès, in the Gers département
 Castelnau-d'Arbieu, in the Gers département
 Castelnau-d'Aude, in the Aude département
 Castelnau-d'Auzan, in the Gers département
 Castelnau-d'Estrétefonds, in the Haute-Garonne département
 Castelnau-de-Brassac, in the Tarn département
 Castelnau-de-Guers, in the Hérault département
 Castelnau-de-Lévis, in the Tarn département
 Castelnau-de-Mandailles, in the Aveyron département
 Castelnau-de-Médoc, in the Gironde département
 Castelnau-de-Montmiral, in the Tarn département
 Castelnau-Durban, in the Ariège département
 Castelnau-le-Lez, in the Hérault département
 Castelnau-Magnoac, in the Hautes-Pyrénées département
 Castelnau-Montratier, in the Lot département 
 Castelnau-Pégayrols, in the Aveyron département
 Castelnau-Picampeau, in the Haute-Garonne département
 Castelnau-Rivière-Basse, in the Hautes-Pyrénées département 
 Castelnau-sur-Gupie, in the Lot-et-Garonne département
 Castelnau-sur-l'Auvignon, in the Gers département
 Castelnau-Tursan, in the Landes département
 Castelnau-Valence, in the Gard département
 Castelnaud-de-Gratecambe, in the Lot-et-Garonne département
 Castelnaud-la-Chapelle, in the Dordogne département
 Saint-Michel-de-Castelnau, in the Gironde département

England
 Castelnau, London, an estate and road in Barnes, south-west London

Canada
 De Castelnau station, a Montreal Metro station in the Villeray–Saint-Michel–Parc-Extension borough
 Castelnau Lake, a freshwater body of the catchment area of the rivière à la Chasse in Baie-Comeau, Quebec

People
 Michel de Castelnau, sieur de la Mauvissière (c. 1520–1592), French diplomat and soldier
 Emmanuel Boileau de Castelnau (1857-1923), French mountain climber
 François-Louis Laporte, comte de Castelnau (1810–1880), French naturalist
 Noël Édouard, vicomte de Curières de Castelnau (1851–1944), French general

See also 
 Château de Castelnau-Bretenoux, a castle in the commune of Prudhomat, Lot département, France
Châteauneuf (disambiguation)
Neufchâtel (disambiguation)
Neuchâtel
Newcastle (disambiguation)
Neuburg (disambiguation)